Dòideag (pronounced ) was a famous legendary witch from the Isle of Mull in Scotland. According to local folklore and mythology, she was responsible for the demise of the Spanish Armada.

According to another version, she was one of "Na Dòideagan" (the Doideags), who were connected with Maclean of Duart, and sank a Spanish armada ship off Tobermory, Isle of Mull. There is still some confusion over what ship this was, some say it was the Almirante di Florencia, one of the treasure ships also known as the Florencia or the Florida. Others claim it was the vessel San Juan De Sicilia with plenty of troops but very little treasure on board.

References

Further reading
  
 

Isle of Mull
Scottish folklore